The England national netball team played a three-match test series (officially referred to as the 2021 Vitality Legends Series) against an All-Stars team made up of players from the Superleague competition in the United Kingdom. The series took place between 20 and 24 January 2021 and replaced a previously scheduled series between England and Jamaica, which was cancelled due to the impact of the COVID-19 pandemic. The three matches were played behind closed doors at the David Wallace Arena in Loughborough. The series was won by England, who defeated the All-Stars three games to nil, and in so doing won the Jean Hornsby Cup.

Squads

Matches

First test

Second test

Third test

References

External links
 England Netball
 Netball Scoop Series Overview

2021 in English netball
England national netball team series
Netball Superleague